Sakari Salo  (21 December 1919 – 13 December 2011) was a tennis and bandy player from Finland.

Tennis career
Salo represented Finland from 1950 to 1963 in the Davis Cup competition. He made his Davis Cup debut during the 1950 Europe Zone first round tie against Belgium. During his Davis Cup career, Salo played in twenty-nine Davis Cup singles rubbers, winning thirteen, and in seventeen doubles rubbers, with four victories.

Salo participated at the 1952 Wimbledon Championships playing in the singles, doubles and mixed doubles. In the mixed doubles, he partnered with his wife Thelma Salo, and reached the third round.

Bandy career
Salo represented Finland at the 1952 Winter Olympics in Oslo when Bandy was held as a demonstration sport. Salo won a bronze medal as a member of the Finnish team.

See also
 List of Finland Davis Cup team representatives

References

External links
 
 
 

1919 births
2011 deaths 
Finnish male tennis players
Finnish bandy players
Winter Olympics competitors for Finland
Bandy players at the 1952 Winter Olympics
Medalists at the 1952 Winter Olympics
Sportspeople from Helsinki